The National Book Critics Circle Awards are a set of annual American literary awards by the National Book Critics Circle (NBCC) to promote "the finest books and reviews published in English". The first NBCC awards were announced and presented January 16, 1976.

Six awards are presented annually to books published in the U.S. during the preceding calendar year, in six categories: Fiction, Nonfiction, Poetry, Memoir/Autobiography, Biography, and Criticism. Four of them span the entire NBCC award history; Memoir/Autobiography and Biography were recognized by one "Autobiography/Biography" award for publication years 1983 to 2004, then replaced by two awards.  Beginning in 2014, the NBCC also presents a special "first book" award across all six categories, named the John Leonard Award in honor of literary critic and NBCC founding member John Leonard, who died in 2008.

Books previously published in English are not eligible, such as re-issues and paperback editions. Nor does the NBC Circle consider "cookbooks, self help books (including inspirational literature), reference books, picture books or children's books". They do consider "translations, short story and essay collections, self published books, and any titles that fall under the general categories".

The judges are the volunteer directors of the NBCC who are 24 members serving rotating three-year terms, with eight elected annually by the voting members, namely "professional book review editors and book reviewers".

Winners of the awards are announced each year at the NBCC awards ceremony in conjunction with the yearly membership meeting, which takes place in March.

==Award categories==

 Biography
 Criticism
 Fiction
 General nonfiction
 Ivan Sandrof Lifetime Achievement Award
 John Leonard Prize for Best First Book
 Memoir/Autobiography
 Nona Balakian Citation for Excellence in Reviewing
 Poetry

References

External links

 Official website

Awards established in 1975
20th-century literary awards
21st-century literary awards